"Tell Me What We're Gonna Do Now" is a song by English singer and songwriter Joss Stone featuring American rapper Common. Written by Stone, Alonzo "Novel" Stevenson, Tony Reyes, Mark Batson and Common and produced by Raphael Saadiq, the song was released as the second single from Stone's third album Introducing Joss Stone in July 2007. It was later included on the 2011 compilation album The Best of Joss Stone 2003–2009.

Chart performance
"Tell Me What We're Gonna Do Now" had a lacklustre performance in the United Kingdom, where it peaked at number eighty-four on the UK Singles Chart the week of 4 August 2007 and spent only one week on the tally, becoming Stone's first solo single to miss the UK top seventy-five. It charted mildly in other countries such as Canada, Germany, Romania and Switzerland. Nevertheless, the single did manage to achieve success in Turkey and the Netherlands, where it peaked at numbers four and twenty-three, respectively. It was also Stone's second single (the first being 2005's "Spoiled") to chart on the U.S. Hot R&B/Hip-Hop Songs, on which it debuted at number sixty-nine the week of 28 April 2007 (after debuting at number twelve on the Bubbling Under R&B/Hip-Hop Singles) and reached its peak position of number sixty-four four weeks later. Surprisingly, "Tell Me What We're Gonna Do Now" debuted at number thirty-eight in Greece the week of 23 February 2008, peaking at number thirty-two the following week.

Music video

The music video for "Tell Me What We're Gonna Do Now", directed by Sanaa Hamri and filmed in New York City, premiered on VH1 Soul on 7 May 2007 and on VH1's VSpot Top 20 Countdown, and has also been viewed on YouTube over 24 million times (as of 15 October 2010) on 12 May. In aid of U2's frontman Bono's initiative Product Red, an organization helping finance the fight of HIV/AIDS in Africa, 100% of the proceeds from copies of the video sold on iTunes were reverted to the Global Fund to Fight AIDS, Tuberculosis and Malaria; Stone is the first artist to do so.

The video starts with a red gerbera being held by the cameraman, who heads for a typical New York City terraced house from which Stone shows up. He hands the gerbera in to her and proceeds to film Stone as the two go for a walk around the city. Next, they take a break and sit on a bench in the city centre, where the cameraman caresses Stone's face and hands a drink plastic glass in to her. They then head for the backstage of Stone's outdoor concert in a park; she gets changed in an impromptu dressing room and subsequently comes onto the stage (where a Product Red billboard can be seen in the background) along with Common before a crowded audience. Common performs his rap segment followed by the song's final lines. As the concert ends, Stone takes the cameraman to the backstage where she kisses the camera as if she had kissed the man. Intercut shots of Stone wearing a skin-coloured suit and purple high heels while lying on a flower-covered floor are included from the scene in which Stone and the cameraman are sitting on the bench.

Track listings
CD maxi single
 "Tell Me What We're Gonna Do Now"  – 4:22
 "Tell Me 'bout It"  – 5:20
 "What Were We Thinking"  – 5:25

UK CD single
 "Tell Me What We're Gonna Do Now"  – 4:22
 "Music"  – 4:20

US promo CD single
 "Tell Me What We're Gonna Do Now"  – 3:40
 "Tell Me What We're Gonna Do Now"  – 3:58
 "Tell Me What We're Gonna Do Now"  – 4:23

Personnel

Musicians
 Joss Stone – vocals
 Common – vocals
 Raphael Saadiq – bass
 Khari Parker – drums
 Robert Ozuna – additional drums, percussion, turntablism
 Chalmers "Spanky" Alford – guitar
 Lionel Holoman – organ
 Charlie Happiness – claves

Production
 Raphael Saadiq – producer
 Glenn Standridge – mixing
 Chuck Brungardt – mixing
 Oswald Bowe – assistant engineer
 John Tanksley – assistant engineer
 James Tanksley – assistant engineer
 Marlon Marcel – assistant engineer
 Charlie Stavish – assistant engineer
 Jeremy Mackenzie – Pro Tools operator
 Benjamin Wright – string arrangements

Charts

References

2007 singles
Common (rapper) songs
Joss Stone songs
Music videos directed by Sanaa Hamri
Songs written by Joss Stone
Song recordings produced by Raphael Saadiq
Songs written by Common (rapper)
Song recordings produced by Mark Batson
2007 songs
Songs written by Mark Batson
Relentless Records singles
Songs written by Novel (musician)
Alternative hip hop songs
Songs written by Tony Reyes